Rachel Amanda Aurora or better known as Rachel Amanda (born 1 January 1995) is an Indonesian actress and singer of Javanese descent.

Career
After her debut in the soap opera Candy, Amanda was given parts in other soap operas, such as Lia, Tersanjung 6, Nirmala, Papaku Keren-Keren, Pintu Hidayah, Soleha, Doa dan Karunia, and Indra Keenam.

Amanda starred in Heart (2005) and I Love You, Uncle... (2006) with Restu Sinaga, Ira Wibowo and Karenina. In the film, Amanda played Dion, a girl who loves a man much older than herself. She was nominated for "Breakthrough Actor/Actress" at the 2007 MTV Indonesia Movie Awards.

Amanda released her 2005 debut compilation album Indonesia Menangis which produced the single "Indonesia Jangan Bersedih". Amanda won the "Best Children Female Solo Artist" award at the 2005 Anugerah Musik Indonesia.

In 2009, Amanda appeared in the movie Kata Maaf Terakhir and did voice work in the film Paddle Pop Kombatei The Movie. She began appearing in the soap opera Kejora dan Bintang in 2009. In June 2009, Amanda collaborated with a religious singer, Opick, to sing "Maha Melihat".

Discography

Studio albums
 Amanda (2012)

Compilation albums
 Indonesia Menangis (Indonesia Cries) (2005)
 Bunga Kasih Sayang (Flower of Affection) (2006)
 Cinta Ramadan (Ramadan Love) (2008)

Single

Guest singer

Filmography

Film

Television

TV commercials
 Tini Wini Biti
 Yakult
 Six Sence
 Bata
 Daihatsu Grand Max
 Suzuki APV Arena
 KFC
 LG
 Wafer Oreo

Awards and nominations

References

External links
 Web Series Arteta in 2015 Apps Nomad

Indonesian film actresses
21st-century Indonesian women singers
Actresses from Jakarta
1995 births
Living people
Indonesian child actresses
Indonesian television actresses
Soap opera actresses
Singers from Jakarta
Indonesian Muslims